Twisters is a New Mexican cuisine restaurant chain from the city of Albuquerque, New Mexico, which was founded in 1998.

Today
Twisters is known for their green chile cheeseburgers and burritos. They also serve other New Mexican staples like sopapillas, enchiladas, fried apple bites, tacos, french fries, rice, and beans.

Reception
They won Albuquerque The Magazine's "Best of the City" Best Burrito award four times in a row from 2010 to 2013.

In popular culture
The location at 4275 Isleta Boulevard SW in Albuquerque is best known for its appearance in the AMC dramas Breaking Bad and Better Call Saul as an outlet of Gus Fring's fast food chicken chain Los Pollos Hermanos. Its real-life counterpart makes a brief cameo in the film sequel, El Camino.

References

External links
 

Restaurants established in 1998
Restaurant chains in the United States
Restaurants in Albuquerque, New Mexico
Restaurants in New Mexico
Restaurants in Colorado
1998 establishments in New Mexico